Berberis ilicina is a shrub in the Berberidaceae described as a species in 1836. It is endemic to northeastern Mexico, found in the States of Hidalgo and Tamaulipas.

References

ilicina
Flora of Mexico
Plants described in 1836